Arnoud Greidanus (born 1 June 1981) is a Dutch lightweight rower. He won a gold medal at the 2007 World Rowing Championships in Munich with the lightweight men's eight. In 2012 he won a silver medal at the 2012 World Rowing Championships in Plovdiv with the lightweight men's pair, together with Joris Pijs.

References

1981 births
Living people
Dutch male rowers
World Rowing Championships medalists for the Netherlands